Krasnoznamensky District is an administrative district (raion), one of the fifteen in Kaliningrad Oblast, Russia. It is located in the northeast of the oblast. Its administrative center is the town of Krasnoznamensk. As of the 2010 Census, the total population of the district was 12,905, with the population of Krasnoznamensk accounting for 27.3% of that number.

Geography
The district is situated in the far northeast of the oblast, at the border with Lithuania. The Neman River forms its northern border; another river in the district is the Sheshupe.

History
The district was established on September 7, 1946.

Administrative and municipal status
Within the framework of administrative divisions, Krasnoznamensky District is one of the fifteen in the oblast. The town of Krasnoznamensk serves as its administrative center.

As a municipal division, the district has been incorporated as Krasnoznamensky Urban Okrug since May 5, 2015. Prior to that date, the district was incorporated as Krasnoznamensky Municipal District, which was subdivided into one urban settlement and three rural settlements.

Economy
The economy of the district is agrarian. Forests and steppe pasture-land prevail. No major roads or railways pass through, with public transportation being provided mostly by bus routes.

References

Notes

Sources

Калининградский областной Совет народных депутатов РСФСР. "Административно-территориальное деление Калининградской области" (Administrative-Territorial Division of Kaliningrad Oblast). Калининградское книжное издательство, 1989. 

Districts of Kaliningrad Oblast
States and territories established in 1946